Masibusane Zongo (born 30 March 1990 in Mthatha, Eastern Cape) is a South African football (soccer) midfielder who plays for Tshakhuma Tsha Madzivhandila.

He was recalled for a second trial with Tottenham Hotspur, a high profile team in the Premier League. On 1 April 2011 was released from his contract by Vasco da Gama. In November 2011 he returned to Premier Soccer League club Supersport United. On 1 February 2012 he signed for Bidvest Wits.

References

External links
Masibusane Zongo at Footballdatabase

1990 births
Living people
South African soccer players
South African expatriate soccer players
Association football midfielders
South African Premier Division players
National First Division players
Extension Gunners FC players
SuperSport United F.C. players
University of Pretoria F.C. players
Bidvest Wits F.C. players
Vasco da Gama (South Africa) players
Chippa United F.C. players
Platinum Stars F.C. players
Royal Eagles F.C. players
People from Mthatha
South African expatriate sportspeople in Botswana
Expatriate footballers in Botswana
Soccer players from the Eastern Cape